Atheism, in the broadest sense, is an absence of belief in the existence of deities. In a narrower sense, atheism is specifically the position that there  no deities and any statements to the contrary are false ones. The English term 'atheist' was used at least as early as the sixteenth century and atheistic ideas and their influence have a longer history.

In the East, a contemplative life not centered on the idea of deities began in the sixth century BCE with the rise of Indian religions such as Jainism, Buddhism, and various sects of Hinduism in ancient India, and of Taoism in ancient China. Within the astika ("orthodox") schools of Hindu philosophy, the Samkhya and the early Mimamsa school did not accept a creator deity in their respective systems.

Philosophical atheist thought began to appear in Europe and Asia in the sixth or fifth century BCE. Will Durant, in his The Story of Civilization, explained that certain pygmy tribes found in Africa were observed to have no identifiable cults or rites. There were no totems, no deities, and no spirits. Their dead were buried without special ceremonies or accompanying items and received no further attention. They even appeared to lack simple superstitions, according to travelers' reports.

The Reformation and the Enlightenment fueled skepticism and secularism against religion in Europe.

Etymology
Atheism  is derived from the Ancient Greek ἄθεος atheos meaning "without gods; godless; secular; refuting or repudiating the existence of gods, especially officially sanctioned gods".

Indian philosophy

In the East, a contemplative life not centered on the idea of deities began in the sixth century BCE with the rise of Jainism, Buddhism, and various sects of Hinduism in India, and of Taoism in China. These religions offered a philosophic and salvific path not involving deity worship. Deities are not seen as necessary to the salvific goal of the early Buddhist tradition; their reality is explicitly questioned and often rejected. There is a fundamental incompatibility between the notion of gods and basic Buddhist principles, at least in some interpretations. Some Buddhist philosophers assert that belief in an eternal creator god is a distraction from the central task of the religious life.

Within the astika ("orthodox") schools of Hindu philosophy, the Samkhya and the early Mimamsa school did not accept a creator-deity in their respective systems.

The principal text of the Samkhya school, the Samkhya Karika, was written by Ishvara Krishna in the fourth century CE, by which time it was already a dominant Hindu school. The origins of the school are much older and are lost in legend. The school was both dualistic and atheistic. They believed in a dual existence of Prakriti ("nature") and Purusha ("consciousness") and had no place for an Ishvara ("God") in its system, arguing that the existence of Ishvara cannot be proved and hence cannot be admitted to exist. The school dominated Hindu philosophy in its day, but declined after the tenth century, although commentaries were still being written as late as the sixteenth century.

The foundational text for the Mimamsa school is the Purva Mimamsa Sutras of Jaimini (c. third to first century BCE). The school reached its height c. 700 CE, and for some time in the Early Middle Ages exerted near-dominant influence on learned Hindu thought. The Mimamsa school saw their primary enquiry was into the nature of dharma based on close interpretation of the Vedas. Its core tenets were ritualism (orthopraxy), antiasceticism and antimysticism. The early Mimamsakas believed in an adrishta ("unseen") that is the result of performing karmas ("works") and saw no need for an Ishvara ("God") in their system. Mimamsa persists in some subschools of Hinduism today.

Cārvāka
The thoroughly materialistic and antireligious philosophical Cārvāka (also known as Lokayata) school that originated in India with the Bārhaspatya-sūtras (final centuries BCE) is probably the most explicitly atheist school of philosophy in the region, if not the world. These ancient schools of generic skepticism had started to develop far earlier than the Mauryan period. Already in the sixth century BCE Ajita Kesakambalin was quoted in Pali scriptures by the Buddhists with whom he was debating, teaching that "with the break-up of the body, the wise and the foolish alike are annihilated, destroyed. They do not exist after death."

Cārvākan philosophy is now known principally from its Astika and Buddhist opponents. The proper aim of a Cārvākan, according to these sources, was to live a prosperous, happy, productive life in this world. In the book More Studies on the Cārvāka/Lokāyata (Cambridge Scholars Publishing, 2020) Ramkrishna Bhattacharya argues that there have been many varieties of materialist thought in India; and that there is no foundation to the accusations of hedonism nor to the claim that these schools reject inference (anumāna) per se as a way of knowledge (pramāṇas).

The Tattvopaplavasimha of Jayarashi Bhatta (c. 8th century) is sometimes cited as a surviving Carvaka text, as Ethan Mills does in Three Pillars of Skepticism in Classical India: Nagarjuna, Jayarasi, and Sri Harsa (2018). It has been claimed that the school died out sometime around the fifteenth century.

In the oldest of the Upanishads, in chapter 2 of the Brhadāranyaka (ca. 700 BCE), the leading theorist Yājnavalkya states in a passage often referred to by the irreligious: "so I say, after death there is no awareness." In the main work by the "father of linguistics", Panini (ca. 4th c. BCE), the main (Kasika) commentary on his affix regarding nastika explains: "an atheist" is one "whose belief is that there is no Hereafter" (4.4.60). Cārvāka arguments are also present in the oldest Sanskrit epic, Ramayana (early parts from 3rd c. BCE), in which the hero Rama is lectured by the sage Javali – who states that the worship of gods is "laid down in the Shastras by clever people, just to rule over other people and make them submissive and disposed to charity."

The Veda philosopher Adi Shankara (ca 790–820), who consolidated the non-dualist Advaita Vedanta tradition, spends several pages trying to refute the non-religious schools, as he argues against "Unlearned people, and the Lokayatikas (…)"

According to the global historian of ideas Dag Herbjørnsrud, the atheist Carvaka schools were present at the court of the Muslim-born Mughal ruler, Akbar (1542–1605), an inquiring skeptic who believed in "the pursuit of reason" over "reliance on tradition". When he invited philosophers and representatives of the different religions to his new "House of Worship" (Ibadat Khana) in Fatehpur Sikri, Carvakas were present as well. According to the chronicler Abul Fazl (1551–1602), those discussing religious and existential matters at Akbar's court included the atheists:

Herbjørnsrud argues that the Carvaka schools never disappeared in India, and that the atheist traditions of India influenced Europe from the late 16th century: "The Europeans were surprised by the openness and rational doubts of Akbar and the Indians. In Pierre De Jarric's Histoire (1610), based on the Jesuit reports, the Mughal emperor is actually compared to an atheist himself: “Thus we see in this Prince the common fault of the atheist, who refuses to make reason subservient to faith (…)”

Hannah Chapelle Wojciehowski concludes as follows concerning the Jesuit descriptions in her paper “East-West Swerves: Cārvāka Materialism and Akbar's Religious Debates at Fatehpur Sikri” (2015):
{{blockquote|…The information they sent back to Europe was disseminated widely in both Catholic and Protestant countries (…) A more detailed understanding of Indian philosophies, including Cārvāka, began to emerge in Jesuit missionary writings by the early to mid-seventeenth century.}}

The Jesuit Roberto De Nobili wrote in 1613 that the “Logaidas” (Lokayatas) "hold the view that the elements themselves are god". Some decades later, Heinrich Roth, who studied Sanskrit in Agra ca. 1654–60, translated the Vedantasara by the influential Vedantic commentator Sadananda (14th), a text that depicts four different schools of the Carvaka philosophies. Wojciehowski notes: "Rather than proclaiming a Cārvāka renaissance in Akbar's court, it would be safer to suggest that the ancient school of materialism never really went away."

Buddhism

The nonadherence to the notion of a supreme deity or a prime mover is seen by many as a key distinction between Buddhism and other religions. While Buddhist traditions do not deny the existence of supernatural beings (many are discussed in Buddhist scripture), it does not ascribe powers, in the typical Western sense, for creation, salvation or judgement, to the "gods"; however, praying to enlightened deities is sometimes seen as leading to some degree of spiritual merit.

Buddhists accept the existence of beings in higher realms, known as devas, but they, like humans, are said to be suffering in samsara, and not particularly wiser than we are. In fact the Buddha is often portrayed as a teacher of the deities, and superior to them. Despite this they do have some enlightened Devas in the path of buddhahood.

Jainism

Jains see their tradition as eternal. Organized Jainism can be dated back to Parshva who lived in the ninth century BCE, and, more reliably, to Mahavira, a teacher of the sixth century BCE, and a contemporary of the Buddha. Jainism is a dualistic religion with the universe made up of matter and souls. The universe, and the matter and souls within it, is eternal and uncreated, and there is no omnipotent creator deity in Jainism. There are, however, "gods" and other spirits who exist within the universe and Jains believe that the soul can attain "godhood"; however, none of these supernatural beings exercise any sort of creative activity or have the capacity or ability to intervene in answers to prayers.

Classical Greece and Rome

In Western Classical Antiquity, theism was the fundamental belief that supported the legitimacy of the state (the polis, later the Roman Empire). Historically, any person who did not believe in any deity supported by the state was fair game to accusations of atheism, a capital crime. Charges of atheism (meaning any subversion of religion) were often used similarly to charges of heresy and impiety as a political tool to eliminate enemies. Early Christians were widely reviled as atheists because they did not participate in the cults of the Greco-Roman gods. During the Roman Empire, Christians were executed for their rejection of the pagan deities in general and the Imperial cult of ancient Rome in particular.Maycock, A.L. and Ronald Knox (2003). Inquisition from Its Establishment to the Great Schism: An Introductory Study . .  When Christianity became the Roman state religion under Theodosius I in 381, heresy became a punishable offense.

Poets and playwrights
Aristophanes (c. 448–380 BCE), known for his satirical style, wrote in his play the Knights:
"Shrines! Shrines! Surely you don't believe in the gods. What's your argument? Where's your proof?"

Euhemerus
Euhemerus (c. 330–260 BCE) published his view that the gods were only the deified rulers, conquerors, and founders of the past, and that their cults and religions were in essence the continuation of vanished kingdoms and earlier political structures. Although Euhemerus was later criticized for having "spread atheism over the whole inhabited earth by obliterating the gods", his worldview was not atheist in a strict and theoretical sense, because he differentiated them from the primordial deities, holding that they were "eternal and imperishable". Some historians have argued that he merely aimed at reinventing the old religions in the light of the beginning of deification of political rulers such as Alexander the Great. Euhemerus' work was translated into Latin by Ennius, possibly to mythographically pave the way for the planned divinization of Scipio Africanus in Rome.

Philosophy

The roots of Western philosophy began in the Greek world in the sixth century BCE. The first Hellenic philosophers were not atheists, but they attempted to explain the world in terms of the processes of nature instead of by mythological accounts. Thus lightning was the result of "wind breaking out and parting the clouds", and earthquakes occurred when "the earth is considerably altered by heating and cooling". The early philosophers often criticized traditional religious notions. Xenophanes (6th century BCE) famously said that if cows and horses had hands, "then horses would draw the forms of gods like horses, and cows like cows". Another philosopher, Anaxagoras (5th century BCE), claimed that the Sun was "a fiery mass, larger than the Peloponnese"; a charge of impiety was brought against him, and he was forced to flee Athens.

The first fully materialistic philosophy was produced by the atomists Leucippus and Democritus (5th century BCE), who attempted to explain the formation and development of the world in terms of the chance movements of atoms moving in infinite space.

For political reasons, Socrates was accused of being atheos ("refusing to acknowledge the gods recognized by the state"). The Athenian public associated Socrates (c. 470–399 BCE) with the trends in pre-Socratic philosophy towards naturalistic inquiry and the rejection of divine explanations for phenomena. Aristophanes' comic play The Clouds (performed 423 BCE) portrayed Socrates as teaching his students that the traditional Greek deities did not exist. Socrates was later tried and executed under the charge of not believing in the gods of the state and instead worshipping foreign gods. Socrates himself vehemently denied the charges of atheism at his trial. in  All the surviving sources about him indicate that he was a very devout man, who prayed to the rising sun and believed that the oracle at Delphi spoke the word of Apollo.

While only a few of the ancient Greco-Roman schools of philosophy were subject to accusations of atheism, there were some individual philosophers who espoused atheist views. The Peripatetic philosopher Strato of Lampsacus did not believe in the existence of gods. The Cyrenaic philosopher Theodorus the Atheist (c. 300 BCE) is supposed to have denied that gods exist and wrote a book On the Gods expounding his views.

The Sophists
In the fifth century BCE the Sophists began to question many of the traditional assumptions of Greek culture. Prodicus of Ceos was said to have believed that "it was the things which were serviceable to human life that had been regarded as gods", and Protagoras stated at the beginning of a book that "With regard to the gods I am unable to say either that they exist or do not exist". Diagoras of Melos allegedly chopped up a wooden statue of Heracles and used it to roast his lentils and revealed the secrets of the Eleusinian Mysteries. The Athenians accused him of impiety and banished him from their city. Critias was said as well to deny that the gods existed.

Epicureanism
The most important Greek thinker in the development of atheism was Epicurus ( 300 BCE). Drawing on the ideas of Democritus and the Atomists, he espoused a materialistic philosophy according to which the universe was governed by the laws of chance without the need for divine intervention (see scientific determinism). Although Epicurus still maintained that the gods existed, he believed that they were uninterested in human affairs. The aim of the Epicureans was to attain ataraxia (a mental state of being untroubled). One important way of doing this was by exposing fear of divine wrath as irrational. The Epicureans also denied the existence of an afterlife and the need to fear divine punishment after death.

One of the most eloquent expressions of Epicurean thought is Lucretius' On the Nature of Things (1st century BCE) in which he held that gods exist but argued that religious fear was one of the chief causes of human unhappiness and that the gods did not involve themselves in the world. The Epicureans also denied the existence of an afterlife and hence dismissed the fear of death.

Epicureans denied being atheists but their critics insisted they were. One explanation for this alleged crypto-atheism is that they feared persecution, and while they avoided this their teachings were controversial and harshly attacked by some of the other schools, particularly Stoicism and Neoplatonism.

Pyrrhonism
Similar to the Epicureans, the Pyrrhonists employed a tactic to avoid persecution for atheism in which they, in conformity with ancestral customs and laws, declared that the gods exist, and performed everything which contributes to their worship and veneration, but, with regard to philosophy, declined to commit themselves to the gods' existence. The Pyrrhonist philosopher Sextus Empiricus compiled a large number of ancient arguments against the existence of gods, recommending that one should suspend judgment regarding the matter. His large volume of surviving works had a lasting influence on later philosophers.

Medicine

In pre-Hippocratic times, Greeks believed that gods controlled all aspects of human existence, including health and disease. One of the earliest works that challenged the religious view was On the Sacred Disease, written about 400 B.C. The anonymous author argued that the "sacred disease" of epilepsy has a natural cause, and that the idea of its supposed divine origin is based on human inexperience.

The Middle Ages
Islamic world

In the early history of Islam, Muslim scholars recognized the idea of atheism and frequently attacked unbelievers, although they were unable to name any atheists. When individuals were accused of atheism, they were usually viewed as heretics rather than proponents of atheism. However, there were freethinkers and outspoken critics of the Islamic religion such as deists, philosophers, rationalists, and atheists in the medieval Islamic world, one notable figure being the 9th-century scholar Ibn al-Rawandi, who criticized the notion of religious prophecy, including that of Muhammad, and maintained that religious dogmas were not acceptable to reason and must be rejected. Other critics of religion in the Islamic world include the poet Al-Maʿarri (973–1057), the scholar Abu Isa al-Warraq (fl. 9th century), and the physician and philosopher Abu Bakr al-Razi (865–925). However, al-Razi's atheism may have been "deliberately misdescribed" by an Ismaili missionary named Abu Hatim. Al-Maʿarri wrote and taught that religion itself was a "fable invented by the ancients" and that humans were "of two sorts: those with brains, but no religion, and those with religion, but no brains."

Europe
The titular character of the Icelandic saga Hrafnkell, written in the late thirteenth century, says, "I think it is folly to have faith in gods". After his temple to Freyr is burnt and he is enslaved, he vows never to perform another sacrifice, a position described in the sagas as goðlauss, "godless". Jacob Grimm in his Teutonic Mythology observes,
It is remarkable that Old Norse legend occasionally mentions certain men who, turning away in utter disgust and doubt from the heathen faith, placed their reliance on their own strength and virtue. Thus in the Sôlar lioð 17 we read of Vêbogi and Râdey â sik þau trûðu, "in themselves they trusted",
citing several other examples, including two kings. Subsequent to Grimm's investigation, scholars including J. R. R. Tolkien and E.O.G. Turville-Petre have identified the goðlauss ethic as a stream of atheistic and/or humanistic philosophy in the Icelandic sagas. People described as goðlauss expressed not only a lack of faith in deities, but also a pragmatic belief in their own faculties of strength, reason and virtue and in social codes of honor independent of any supernatural agency.

Another phenomenon in the Middle Ages was proofs of the existence of God. Both Anselm of Canterbury, and later, William of Ockham acknowledge adversaries who doubt the existence of God. Thomas Aquinas' five proofs of God's existence and Anselm's ontological argument implicitly acknowledged the validity of the question about God's existence. Frederick Copleston, however, explains that Thomas laid out his proofs not to counter atheism, but to address certain early Christian writers such as John of Damascus, who asserted that knowledge of God's existence was naturally innate in man, based on his natural desire for happiness. Thomas stated that although there is desire for happiness which forms the basis for a proof of God's existence in man, further reflection is required to understand that this desire is only fulfilled in God, not for example in wealth or sensual pleasure. However, Aquinas's Five Ways also address (hypothetical) atheist arguments citing evil in the universe and claiming that God's existence is unnecessary to explain things.

The charge of atheism was used to attack political or religious opponents. Pope Boniface VIII, because he insisted on the political supremacy of the church, was accused by his enemies after his death of holding (unlikely) positions such as "neither believing in the immortality nor incorruptibility of the soul, nor in a life to come". Sects deemed heretical such as the Waldensians were also accused of being atheistic.

John Arnold's 2005 Belief and Unbelief in Medieval Europe discusses individuals who were indifferent to the Church and did not participate in faith practices. Arnold notes that while these examples could be perceived as simply people being lazy, it demonstrates that "belief was not universally fervent". Arnold enumerates examples of people not attending church, and even those who excluded the Church from their marriage. Disbelief, Arnold argues, stemmed from boredom. Arnold argues that while some blasphemy implies the existence of God, laws demonstrate that there were also cases of blasphemy that directly attacked articles of faith. Italian preachers in the fourteenth century also warned of unbelievers and people who lacked belief.

Renaissance and Reformation
During the time of the Renaissance and the Reformation, criticism of the religious establishment became more frequent in predominantly Christian countries, but did not amount to atheism, per se.

The term athéisme was coined in France in the sixteenth century. The word "atheist" appears in English books at least as early as 1566.
The concept of atheism re-emerged initially as a reaction to the intellectual and religious turmoil of the Age of Enlightenment and the Reformation, as a charge used by those who saw the denial of god and godlessness in the controversial positions being put forward by others. During the sixteenth and seventeenth centuries, the word 'atheist' was used exclusively as an insult; nobody wanted to be regarded as an atheist. Although one overtly atheistic compendium known as the Theophrastus redivivus was published by an anonymous author in the seventeenth century, atheism was an epithet implying a lack of moral restraint.

According to Geoffrey Blainey, the Reformation in Europe had paved the way for atheists by attacking the authority of the Catholic Church, which in turn "quietly inspired other thinkers to attack the authority of the new Protestant churches". Deism gained influence in France, Prussia and England, and proffered belief in a noninterventionist deity, but "while some deists were atheists in disguise, most were religious, and by today's standards would be called true believers". The scientific and mathematical discoveries of such as Copernicus, Newton and Descartes sketched a pattern of natural laws that lent weight to this new outlook.

How dangerous it was to be accused of being an atheist at this time is illustrated by the examples of Étienne Dolet, who was strangled and burned in 1546. The English philosopher Thomas Hobbes (1588–1679) was also accused of atheism, but he denied it. His theism was unusual, in that he held god to be material. Even earlier, the British playwright and poet Christopher Marlowe (1563–1593) was accused of atheism when a tract denying the divinity of Christ was found in his home. Before he could finish defending himself against the charge, Marlowe was murdered. Giulio Cesare Vanini, also accused of being an atheist, was burned at the stake in 1619. 

Blainey wrote that the Dutch philosopher Baruch Spinoza was "probably the first well known 'semi-atheist' to announce himself in a Christian land in the modern era", although nowhere in his work does Spinoza argue against the existence of God. It is a widespread belief that Spinoza equated God with the material universe and so his beliefs have been categorized as Pantheist.Fraser, Alexander Campbell "Philosophy of Theism", William Blackwood and Sons, 1895, p. 163. Spinoza had been expelled from his synagogue for his protests against the teachings of its rabbis and for failing to attend Saturday services. He believed that God did not interfere in the running of the world, but rather that natural laws explained the workings of the universe. In 1661 he published his Short Treatise on God, but he was not a popular figure for the first century following his death: "An unbeliever was expected to be a rebel in almost everything and wicked in all his ways", wrote Blainey, "but here was a virtuous one. He lived the good life and made his living in a useful way. . . . It took courage to be a Spinoza or even one of his supporters. If a handful of scholars agreed with his writings, they did not so say in public".

In early modern times, the first explicit atheist known by name was the German-languaged Danish critic of religion Matthias Knutzen (1646–after 1674), who published three atheist writings in 1674. Knutzen was called "The only person on record who openly professed and taught atheism" in the 1789 Students Pocket Dictionary of Universal History by Thomas Mortimer.

In 1689 the Polish nobleman Kazimierz Łyszczyński, who had denied the existence of God in his philosophical treatise De non-existentia Dei, was imprisoned unlawfully; despite Warsaw Confederation tradition and King Sobieski's intercession, Łyszczyński was condemned to death for atheism and beheaded in Warsaw after his tongue was pulled out with a burning iron and his hands slowly burned. In De non-existentia Dei he had demonstrated strong atheism:

The Age of Enlightenment

While not gaining converts from large portions of the population, versions of deism became influential in certain intellectual circles. Jean Jacques Rousseau challenged the Christian notion that human beings had been tainted by sin since the Garden of Eden, and instead proposed that humans were originally good, only later to be corrupted by civilization. The influential figure of Voltaire spread deistic notions to a wide audience. "After the French Revolution and its outbursts of atheism, Voltaire was widely condemned as one of the causes", wrote Blainey, "Nonetheless, his writings did concede that fear of God was an essential policeman in a disorderly world: 'If God did not exist, it would be necessary to invent him', wrote Voltaire". Voltaire's assertion occurs in his Épître à l'Auteur du Livre des Trois Imposteurs, written in response to the Treatise of the Three Impostors, a document (most likely) authored by John Toland that denied all three Abrahamic religions. In 1766, Voltaire tried unsuccessfully to have the judgment reversed in the case of the French nobleman François-Jean de la Barre who was tortured, beheaded, and his body burned for alleged vandalism of a crucifix.

Arguably the first book in modern times solely dedicated to promoting atheism was written by French Catholic priest Jean Meslier (1664–1729), whose posthumously published lengthy philosophical essay (part of the original title: Thoughts and Feelings of Jean Meslier ... Clear and Evident Demonstrations of the Vanity and Falsity of All the Religions of the World) rejects the concept of God (both in the Christian and also in the Deistic sense), the soul, miracles and the discipline of theology. Philosopher Michel Onfray states that Meslier's work marks the beginning of "the history of true atheism".

By the 1770s, atheism in some predominantly Christian countries was ceasing to be a dangerous accusation that required denial, and was evolving into a position openly avowed by some. The first open denial of the existence of God and avowal of atheism since classical times may be that of Baron d'Holbach (1723–1789) in his 1770 work, The System of Nature. D'Holbach was a Parisian social figure who conducted a famous salon widely attended by many intellectual notables of the day, including Denis Diderot, Jean-Jacques Rousseau, David Hume, Adam Smith, and Benjamin Franklin. Nevertheless, his book was published under a pseudonym, and was banned and publicly burned by the Executioner.  Diderot, one of the Enlightenment's most prominent philosophes and editor-in-chief of the Encyclopédie, which sought to challenge religious, particularly Catholic, dogma said, "Reason is to the estimation of the philosophe what grace is to the Christian", he wrote. "Grace determines the Christian's action; reason the philosophe.'s". Diderot was briefly imprisoned for his writing, some of which was banned and burned.

In Scotland, David Hume produced a six volume history of England in 1754, which gave little attention to God. He implied that if God existed he was impotent in the face of European upheaval. Hume ridiculed miracles, but walked a careful line so as to avoid being too dismissive of Christianity. With Hume's presence, Edinburgh gained a reputation as a "haven of atheism", alarming many ordinary Britons.

The culte de la Raison developed during the uncertain period 1792–94 (Years I and III of the Revolution), following the September massacres, when Revolutionary France was rife with fears of internal and foreign enemies. Several Parisian churches were transformed into Temples of Reason, notably the Church of Saint-Paul Saint-Louis in the Marais. The churches were closed in May 1793 and more securely 24 November 1793, when the Catholic Mass was forbidden.

Blainey wrote that "atheism seized the pedestal in revolutionary France in the 1790s. The secular symbols replaced the cross. In the cathedral of Notre Dame the altar, the holy place, was converted into a monument to Reason..." During the Terror of 1792–93, France's Christian calendar was abolished, monasteries, convents and church properties were seized and monks and nuns expelled. Historic churches were dismantled. The Cult of Reason was a creed based on atheism devised during the French Revolution by Jacques Hébert, Pierre Gaspard Chaumette, and their supporters. It was stopped by Maximilien Robespierre, a Deist, who instituted the Cult of the Supreme Being. Both cults were the outcome of the "de-Christianization" of French society during the Revolution and part of the Reign of Terror.

The Cult of Reason was celebrated in a carnival atmosphere of parades, ransacking of churches, ceremonious iconoclasm, in which religious and royal images were defaced, and ceremonies which substituted the "martyrs of the Revolution" for Christian martyrs. The earliest public demonstrations took place en province, outside Paris, notably by Hébertists in Lyon, but took a further radical turn with the Fête de la Liberté ("Festival of Liberty") at Notre Dame de Paris, 10 November (20 Brumaire) 1793, in ceremonies devised and organised by Pierre-Gaspard Chaumette.

The pamphlet Answer to Dr. Priestley's Letters to a Philosophical Unbeliever (1782) is considered to be the first published declaration of atheism in Britain—plausibly the first in English (as distinct from covert or cryptically atheist works). The otherwise unknown William Hammon (possibly a pseudonym) signed the preface and postscript as editor of the work, and the anonymous main text is attributed to Matthew Turner (d. 1788?), a Liverpool physician who may have known Priestley. Historian of atheism David Berman has argued strongly for Turner's authorship, but also suggested that there may have been two authors.

Modern history
Nineteenth century
The French Revolution of 1789 catapulted atheistic thought into political notability in some Western countries, and opened the way for the nineteenth century movements of Rationalism, Freethought, and Liberalism. Born in 1792, Romantic poet Percy Bysshe Shelley, a child of the Age of Enlightenment, was expelled from England's Oxford University in 1811 for submitting to the Dean an anonymous pamphlet that he wrote entitled, The Necessity of Atheism. This pamphlet is considered by scholars as the first atheistic tract published in the English language. An early atheistic influence in Germany was The Essence of Christianity by Ludwig Feuerbach (1804–1872). He influenced other German nineteenth century atheistic thinkers like Karl Marx, Max Stirner, Arthur Schopenhauer (1788–1860), and Friedrich Nietzsche (1844–1900).

The freethinker Charles Bradlaugh (1833–1891) was repeatedly elected to the British Parliament, but was not allowed to take his seat after his request to affirm rather than take the religious oath was turned down (he then offered to take the oath, but this too was denied him). After Bradlaugh was re-elected for the fourth time, a new Speaker allowed Bradlaugh to take the oath and permitted no objections. He became the first outspoken atheist to sit in Parliament, where he participated in amending the Oaths Act.

In 1844, Karl Marx (1818–1883), an atheistic political economist, wrote in his Contribution to the Critique of Hegel's Philosophy of Right: "Religious suffering is, at one and the same time, the expression of real suffering and a protest against real suffering. Religion is the sigh of the oppressed creature, the heart of a heartless world, and the soul of soulless conditions. It is the opium of the people." Marx believed that people turn to religion in order to dull the pain caused by the reality of social situations; that is, Marx suggests religion is an attempt at transcending the material state of affairs in a society—the pain of class oppression—by effectively creating a dream world, rendering the religious believer amenable to social control and exploitation in this world while they hope for relief and justice in life after death. In the same essay, Marx states, "[m]an creates religion, religion does not create man".

Friedrich Nietzsche, a prominent nineteenth century philosopher, is well known for coining the aphorism "God is dead" (German: "Gott ist tot"); incidentally the phrase was not spoken by Nietzsche directly, but was used as a dialogue for the characters in his works. Nietzsche argued that Christian theism as a belief system had been a moral foundation of the Western world, and that the rejection and collapse of this foundation as a result of modern thinking (the death of God) would naturally cause a rise in nihilism or the lack of values. While Nietzsche was staunchly atheistic, he was also concerned about the negative effects of nihilism on humanity. As such, he called for a re-evaluation of old values and a creation of new ones, hoping that in doing so humans would achieve a higher state he labeled the Overman (Übermensch).

Atheist feminism also began in the nineteenth century. Atheist feminists oppose religion as a main source of female oppression and gender inequality, believing that the majority of religions are sexist and oppressive to women.

Twentieth century
Concepts
Atheism in the twentieth century found recognition in a wide variety of other, broader philosophies in the Western tradition, such as existentialism, objectivism, secular humanism, nihilism, logical positivism, Marxism, anarchism, feminism, and the general scientific and rationalist movement. Neopositivism and analytical philosophy discarded classical rationalism and metaphysics in favor of strict empiricism and epistemological nominalism. Proponents such as Bertrand Russell emphatically rejected belief in God. In his early work, Ludwig Wittgenstein attempted to separate metaphysical and supernatural language from rational discourse. H. L. Mencken sought to debunk both the idea that science and religion are compatible, and the idea that science is a dogmatic belief system just like any religion.

A. J. Ayer asserted the unverifiability and meaninglessness of religious statements, citing his adherence to the empirical sciences. The structuralism of Lévi-Strauss sourced religious language to the human subconscious, denying its transcendental meaning. J. N. Findlay and J. J. C. Smart argued that the existence of God is not logically necessary. Naturalists and materialists such as John Dewey considered the natural world to be the basis of everything, denying the existence of God or immortality.Smart, J.C.C. (9 March 2004). "Atheism and Agnosticism". Stanford Encyclopedia of Philosophy. Retrieved 2007-04-12

The historian Geoffrey Blainey wrote that during the twentieth century, atheists in Western societies became more active and even militant, though they often "relied essentially on arguments used by numerous radical Christians since at least the eighteenth century". They rejected the idea of an interventionist God, and said that Christianity promoted war and violence, though "the most ruthless leaders in the Second World War were atheists and secularists who were intensely hostile to both Judaism and Christianity" and "Later massive atrocities were committed in the East by those ardent atheists, Pol Pot and Mao Zedong". Some scientists were meanwhile articulating a view that as the world becomes more educated, religion will be superseded.

State atheism

Although revolutionary France had taken steps in the direction of state atheism, it was left to Communist and Fascist regimes in the twentieth century to embed atheism as an integral element of national policy.
Initiatives
The Russian Orthodox Church, for centuries the strongest of all Orthodox Churches, was suppressed by the Soviet government. In 1922, the Soviet regime arrested the Patriarch of the Russian Orthodox Church. Following the death of Vladimir Lenin, with his rejection of religious authority as a tool of oppression and his strategy of "patently explain," Soviet leader Joseph Stalin energetically pursued the persecution of the Church through the 1920s and 1930s. Lenin wrote that every religious idea and every idea of God "is unutterable vileness... of the most dangerous kind, 'contagion of the most abominable kind". Many priests were killed and imprisoned. Thousands of churches were closed, some turned into hospitals. In 1925 the government founded the League of Militant Atheists to intensify the persecution. The regime only relented in its persecution following the Nazi invasion of the Soviet Union in 1941. Bullock wrote that "A Marxist regime was 'godless' by definition, and Stalin had mocked religious belief since his days in the Tiflis seminary". His assault on the Russian peasantry, wrote Bullock, "had been as much an attack on their traditional religion as on their individual holdings, and the defense of it had played a major part in arousing peasant resistance . . . ". In Divini Redemptoris, Pius XI said that atheistic Communism being led by Moscow was aimed at "upsetting the social order and at undermining the very foundations of Christian civilization":

The central figure in Italian Fascism was the atheist Benito Mussolini. In his early career, Mussolini was a strident opponent of the Church, and the first Fascist program, written in 1919, had called for the secularization of Church property in Italy. More pragmatic than his German ally Adolf Hitler, Mussolini later moderated his stance, and in office, permitted the teaching of religion in schools and came to terms with the Papacy in the Lateran Treaty.

The Western Allies saw the war against Hitler as a war for "Christian Civilisation",Franklin D. Roosevelt, American Labor Day Address, 1 September 1941 while the atheist Stalin re-opened Russia's churches to steel the Soviet population in the battle against Germany.Geoffrey Blainey; A Short History of Christianity; Viking; 2011; p.494 The Nazi leadership itself held a range of views on religion. Hitler's movement said it endorsed a form of Christianity stripped of its Jewish origins and certain key doctrines such as belief in the divinity of Christ.In 1937, Hans Kerrl, the Nazi Minister for Church Affairs, explained "Positive Christianity" as not "dependent upon the Apostle's Creed", nor in "faith in Christ as the son of God", upon which Christianity relied, but rather, as being represented by the Nazi Party, saying "The Fuehrer is the herald of a new revelation": William L. Shirer (1960). The Rise and Fall of the Third Reich. London: Secker & Warburg. pp. 238–39 In practice, however, the Nazi regime worked to reduce the influence of Christianity in Germany, seeing it as a barrier to their taking over associations and schools belonging to the churches as part of their path of total control over society. Richard J. Evans wrote that "Hitler emphasised again and again his belief that Nazism was a secular ideology founded on modern science. Science, he declared, would easily destroy the last remaining vestiges of superstition ... 'In the long run', [Hitler] concluded in July 1941, 'National Socialism and religion will no longer be able to exist together' [... The ideal solution would be to leave the religions to devour themselves, without persecutions'".

Party membership was required for civil service jobs. The majority of Nazi Party members did not leave their churches. Evans wrote that, by 1939, 95 percent of Germans still called themselves Protestant or Catholic, while 3.5 percent were gottgläubig (lit. "believing in god") and 1.5 percent atheist. Most in these latter categories were "convinced Nazis who had left their Church at the behest of the Party, which had been trying since the mid 1930s to reduce the influence of Christianity in society". The majority of the three million Nazi Party members continued to pay their church taxes and register as either Roman Catholic or Evangelical Protestant Christians. Gottgläubig was a nondenominational Nazified outlook on god beliefs, often described as predominantly based on creationist and deistic views. Heinrich Himmler, who himself was fascinated with Germanic paganism, was a strong promoter of the gottgläubig movement and did not allow atheists into the SS, arguing that their "refusal to acknowledge higher powers" would be a "potential source of indiscipline".

Across Eastern Europe following World War II, the parts of the Nazi Empire conquered by the Soviet Red Army, and Yugoslavia became one-party Communist states, which, like the Soviet Union, were antipathetic to religion. Persecutions of religious leaders followed.Norman Davies; Rising '44: the Battle for Warsaw; Viking; 2003; p.566 & 568 The Soviet Union ended its truce against the Russian Orthodox Church, and extended its persecutions to the newly Communist Eastern bloc: "In Poland, Hungary, Lithuania and other Eastern European countries, Catholic leaders who were unwilling to be silent were denounced, publicly humiliated or imprisoned by the Communists. Leaders of the national Orthodox Churches in Romania and Bulgaria had to be cautious and submissive", wrote Blainey. While the churches were generally not treated as severely as they had been in the USSR, nearly all their schools and many of their church buildings were closed, and they lost their formerly prominent roles in public life. Children were taught atheism, and clergy were imprisoned by the thousands.

Albania under Enver Hoxha became in 1967 a formally declared atheist state, the only such , Representations of Place: Albania, Derek R. Hall, The Geographical Journal, Vol. 165, No. 2, The Changing Meaning of Place in Post-Socialist Eastern Europe: Commodification, Perception and Environment (Jul., 1999), pp. 161–172, Blackwell Publishing on behalf of The Royal Geographical Society (with the Institute of British Geographers) "the perception that religion symbolized foreign (Italian, Greek and Turkish) predation was used to justify the communists' stance of state atheism (1967-1991)." going far beyond what most other countries had attempted—completely prohibiting religious observance and systematically repressing and persecuting adherents. Article 37 of the Albanian Constitution of 1976 stipulated, "The state recognizes no religion, and supports atheistic propaganda in order to implant a scientific materialistic world outlook in people." The right to religious practice was restored with the fall of communism in 1991.

Further post-war communist victories in the East saw religion purged by atheist regimes across China, North Korea and much of Indo-China. In 1949, mainland China became a Communist state under the leadership of Mao Zedong's Chinese Communist Party. China itself had been a cradle of religious thought since ancient times, being the birthplace of Confucianism and Daoism, and Buddhists having arrived in the first century AD. Under Mao, China became officially atheist, and though some religious practices were permitted to continue under State supervision, religious groups deemed a threat to order have been suppressed—as with Tibetan Buddhism from 1959 and Falun Gong in the 21st century. According to Encyclopedia Britannica in 2022, around half of the population claimed to be nonreligious or atheist. Religious schools and social institutions were closed, foreign missionaries expelled, and local religious practices discouraged. During the Cultural Revolution, Mao instigated "struggles" against the Four Olds: "old ideas, customs, culture, and habits of mind". In 1999, the Communist Party launched a three-year drive to promote atheism in Tibet, saying intensifying propaganda on atheism is "especially important for Tibet because atheism plays an extremely important role in promoting economic construction, social advancement and socialist spiritual civilization in the region".

Reaction
In reaction to the upsurge in state atheism, religious organizations, such as the Catholic Church, were among the most forceful opponents of Communist regimes. Pope Pius XI followed his encyclicals challenging the new right-wing creeds of Italian Fascism (Non abbiamo bisogno, 1931) and Nazism (Mit brennender Sorge, 1937) with a denunciation of atheistic Communism in Divini redemptoris (1937). Non abbiamo bisogno specifically condemned Mussolini's Fascist movement's "pagan worship of the State" and "revolution which snatches the young from the Church and from Jesus Christ, and which inculcates in its own young people hatred, violence and irreverence."

Other political developments
 

In India, E. V. Ramasami (Periyar), a prominent atheist leader, fought against Hinduism and the Brahmins for discriminating and dividing people in the name of caste and religion. This was highlighted in 1956 when he made the Hindu god Rama wear a garland made of slippers and made antitheistic statements.

During this period, Christianity in the United States retained its popular appeal, and, wrote Blainey, the country "was the guardian, militarily of the "free world" and the defender of its religion in the face of militant communism". During the Cold War, wrote Thomas Aiello the United States often characterized its opponents as "godless communists", which tended to reinforce the view that atheists were unreliable and unpatriotic. Against this background, the words "under God" were inserted into the pledge of allegiance in 1954, and the national motto was changed from E Pluribus Unum to In God We Trust in 1956. However, there were some prominent atheist activists active at this time. Atheist Vashti McCollum was the plaintiff in a landmark 1948 Supreme Court case (McCollum v. Board of Education) that struck down religious education in U.S. public schools. Madalyn Murray O'Hair was perhaps one of the most influential American atheists; she brought forth the 1963 Supreme Court case Murray v. Curlett which banned compulsory prayer in public schools. Also in 1963 she founded American Atheists, an organization dedicated to defending the civil liberties of atheists and advocating for the complete separation of church and state.

Twenty-first century

The early twenty-first century has continued to see secularism, humanism and atheism promoted in the Western world, with the general consensus being that the number of people not affiliated with any particular religion has increased. This has been assisted by non-profit organizations such as the Freedom From Religion Foundation in the United States (co-founded by Anne Nicol Gaylor and her daughter, Annie Laurie Gaylor, in 1976 and incorporated nationally in 1978, it promotes the separation of church and state), and the Brights movement, which aims to promote public understanding and acknowledgment of science through a naturalistic, scientific and irreligious worldview, defense of irreligious people's human, civil and political rights who share it, and their societal recognition. In addition, a large number of accessible antireligious, antitheist and secularist books, many of which have become bestsellers, have been published by scholars and scientists such as Sam Harris, Richard Dawkins, Daniel Dennett, Christopher Hitchens, Lawrence M. Krauss, Jerry Coyne, and Victor J. Stenger.

This period saw the rise of "New Atheism", a label that has been applied to outspoken critics of theism and religion, prompted by a series of essays published in late 2006, including The God Delusion, Breaking the Spell, God Is Not Great, The End of Faith, and Letter to a Christian Nation. Richard Dawkins also propounds a more visible form of atheist activism which he light-heartedly describes as "militant atheism".

Atheist feminism has also become more prominent in the 2010s. In 2012 the first "Women in Secularism" conference was held. Also, Secular Woman was founded on 28 June 2012 as the first national American organization focused on non-religious women. The mission of Secular Woman is to amplify the voice, presence, and influence of non-religious women. The atheist feminist movement has also become increasingly focused on fighting misogyny, sexism and sexual harassment within the atheist movement itself, especially since the upheaval following Michael Shermer's allegations of sexual assault and coverage of his violent behavior applied by James Randi.

In 2013 the first atheist monument on American government property was unveiled at the Bradford County Courthouse in Florida; it is a 1,500-pound granite bench and plinth inscribed with quotes by Thomas Jefferson, Benjamin Franklin, and Madalyn Murray O'Hair.

In 2015, Madison, Wisconsin's common council amended their city's equal opportunity ordinance, adding atheism as a protected class in the areas of employment, housing, and public accommodations. This makes Madison the first city in America to pass an ordinance protecting atheists.

On 16 December 2016, Barack Obama signed into law the Frank R. Wolf International Religious Freedom Act, which amends the International Religious Freedom Act of 1998 by specifically extending protection to non-theists as well as those who do not claim any particular religion.

See also
 

 A Brief History of Disbelief – 3-part PBS series (2007).
 List of atheist philosophers
 Lists of atheists
 New Atheism
 Rationalist movement
 Theory of religious economy

Footnotes

References
 Alexander, Nathan G. (2019). Race in a Godless World: Atheism, Race, and Civilization, 1850-1914. New York/Manchester: New York University Press/Manchester University Press. 
Armstrong, K. (1999). A History of God. London: Vintage. 
 Berman, D. (1990). A History of Atheism in Britain: from Hobbes to Russell. London: Routledge. 
 Buckley, M. J. (1987). At the origins of modern atheism. New Haven, CT: Yale University Press.
 Drachmann, A. B. (1922). Atheism in Pagan Antiquity. Chicago: Ares Publishers, 1977 ("an unchanged reprint of the 1922 edition"). 
 McGrath, A. (2005). The Twilight of Atheism: The Rise and Fall of Disbelief in the Modern World. 

 Thrower, James (1971). A Short History of Western Atheism. London: Pemberton. 

Further reading
 
 LeDrew, Stephen. The evolution of atheism: The politics of a modern movement (Oxford University Press, 2015).
 Meagher, Richard J. Atheists in American politics: Social movement organizing from the nineteenth to the twenty-first centuries'' (Lexington Books, 2018).

External links 
 Dr. Gordon Stein, The History of Freethought and Atheism at positiveatheism.org.
Dag Herbjørnsrud, "The untold history of India's vital atheist philosophy" at the Blog of the American Philosophical Association (APA), June 2020.

Atheism
Atheism